Sadinja Vas (also archaic Zadina Vas) is a settlement in the City Municipality of Ljubljana in central Slovenia. It is part of the traditional region of Lower Carniola and is now included with the rest of the municipality in the Central Slovenia Statistical Region.

Name

History
In 1940 and 1941 an underground Partisan printing press operated at house no. 33 in the village, commemorated by a plaque. The printing equipment for the workshop was manufactured in Celje by Janko Skvarča (a.k.a. Modras, 1915–1943). There was also a Partisan checkpoint in Sadinja Vas during the Second World War.

Notable people
Notable people that were born or lived in Sadinja Vas include:
Josip Sicherl (1860–1935), composer

References

External links

Sadinja Vas on Geopedia

Populated places in the City Municipality of Ljubljana
Sostro District